Eva Bártová (born 1955) is an orienteering competitor who competed for Czechoslovakia. She won a silver medal in the relay at the 1983 World Orienteering Championships in Zalaegerszeg, together with Iva Kalibanová, Jana Hlavácová and Ada Kucharová.

References

1955 births
Living people
Czechoslovak orienteers
Foot orienteers
Female orienteers
World Orienteering Championships medalists